, also known as  was the fourth legendary Emperor of Japan, according to the traditional order of succession. Very little is known about this emperor due to a lack of material available for further verification and study. Itoku is known as a "legendary emperor" among historians as his actual existence is disputed. Nothing exists in the Kojiki other than his name and genealogy. Itoku's reign allegedly began in 510 BC, he had one wife and two sons. After his death in 477 BC, his first son supposedly became the next emperor.

Legendary narrative
In the Kojiki and Nihon Shoki, only Itoku's name and genealogy were recorded. While the Japanese have traditionally accepted this sovereign's historical existence, no extant contemporary records have been discovered that confirm a view that this historical figure actually reigned. Itoku is believed to be the son of Emperor Annei, and his mother is believed to have been Nunasoko-Nakatsu-hime. The latter of the two is allegedly the granddaughter of Kotoshiro-Nushi-no-kami. The Kojiki records that Itoku was the second or third son of Emperor Annei, but the surviving documents provide no basis for speculating why the elder brother or brothers were passed over for the throne. At some point he married a woman named , and fathered two sons with her. Itoku's reign lasted from 510 BC until his death in 477 BC, his son then took the throne and would later be referred to as Emperor Kōshō.

Known information

The existence of at least the first nine Emperors is disputed due to insufficient material available for further verification and study. Itoku is thus regarded by historians as a "legendary Emperor", and is considered to have been the third of eight Emperors without specific legends associated with them. The name Itoku-tennō was assigned to him posthumously by later generations, and literally means "benign virtue". His name might have been regularized centuries after the lifetime ascribed to Itoku, possibly during the time in which legends about the origins of the Yamato dynasty were compiled as the chronicles known today as the Kojiki. While the actual site of Itoku's grave is not known, the Emperor is traditionally venerated at a memorial Shinto shrine (misasagi) in Kashihara. The Imperial Household Agency designates this location as Itoku's mausoleum. It is formally named Unebi-yama no hitsujisaru Mihodo no i no e no misasagi. The first emperor that historians state might have actually existed is Emperor Sujin, the 10th emperor of Japan. Outside of the Kojiki, the reign of Emperor Kinmei ( – 571 AD) is the first for which contemporary historiography is able to assign verifiable dates. The conventionally accepted names and dates of the early Emperors were not confirmed as "traditional" though, until the reign of Emperor Kanmu between 737 and 806 AD.

Consort and children
Empress: , Prince Okimi's daughter (Emperor Annei's son)
 , later Emperor Kōshō

See also
 Emperor of Japan
 List of Emperors of Japan
 Imperial cult

Notes

References

Further reading
 Aston, William George. (1896).  Nihongi: Chronicles of Japan from the Earliest Times to A.D. 697. London: Kegan Paul, Trench, Trubner.  OCLC 448337491
 Brown, Delmer M. and Ichirō Ishida, eds. (1979).  Gukanshō: The Future and the Past. Berkeley: University of California Press. ;  OCLC 251325323
 Chamberlain, Basil Hall. (1920). The Kojiki. Read before the Asiatic Society of Japan on April 12, May 10, and June 21, 1882; reprinted, May, 1919.  OCLC 1882339
 Nussbaum, Louis-Frédéric and Käthe Roth. (2005).  Japan encyclopedia. Cambridge: Harvard University Press. ;  OCLC 58053128
 Ponsonby-Fane, Richard. (1959).  The Imperial House of Japan. Kyoto: Ponsonby Memorial Society. OCLC 194887
 Titsingh, Isaac. (1834).  Annales des empereurs du Japon (Nihon Ōdai Ichiran).  Paris: Royal Asiatic Society, Oriental Translation Fund of Great Britain and Ireland. OCLC 5850691 
 Varley, H. Paul. (1980).  Jinnō Shōtōki: A Chronicle of Gods and Sovereigns. New York: Columbia University Press. ;  OCLC 59145842

Legendary Emperors of Japan
People of Jōmon-period Japan